Associazione Sportiva Dilettantistica Polisportiva Tamai is an Italian association football club located in Tamai, a frazione of Brugnera, Friuli-Venezia Giulia. It currently plays in Serie D.

History 
The club was founded in 1973.

In the season 2000–01 it was promoted for the first time in Serie D.

Colors and badge 
Its colors are white and red.

External links
Official homepage

Football clubs in Italy
Football clubs in Friuli-Venezia Giulia
Association football clubs established in 1973